Gangwon No.1 Broadcasting or G1, formerly Gangwon Television Broadcasting (GTB) is a Radio and TV station in Gangwon Province, affiliated with the SBS Network.

Stations

 Television
Channel - Ch. 36 (LCN 6–1)
Launched - December 15, 2001
Affiliated to - SBS
Call Sign - HLCG-DTV
 FM radio (Fresh FM)
Frequency - FM 105.1 MHz (Chuncheon), FM 103.1 MHz (Wonju), FM 106.1 MHz (Gangneung), FM 99.3 MHz (Taebaek), FM 88.3 MHz (Pyeongchang)
Launched - October 10, 2003 (Chuncheon, Gangneung), June 1, 2009 (Wonju), December 16, 2011 (Taebaek), September 1, 2012 (Pyeongchang)
Affiliated to - SBS Power FM
Call Sign - HLCG-FM

See also
SBS (Korea)

External links
 

Seoul Broadcasting System affiliates
Television networks in South Korea
Mass media companies of South Korea
Television channels in South Korea
Television channels and stations established in 2001
Mass media in Chuncheon